The Fatala River is a river located in Lower Guinea. It is 205 km long, with its source in the Fria region. It has a basin 6092 km2 in size and flows through the Boffa Prefecture. It is a tributary of the Rio Pongo.

References

Rivers of Guinea